The Edit may refer to:

 The Edit (film), a 1985 short film
 The Edit, a fashion magazine published by Net-a-Porter

See also 
 Edit (disambiguation)